Illindala Saraswati Devi (1918–1998) was a Telugu novelist, short story writer, biographer, essayist and social worker from Andhra Pradesh, India. She received the Sahitya Akademi Award in 1982 for her short story collection, Swarnakamalalu.

Biography
Saraswati Devi was born in 1918 in Andhra Pradesh, India. She started the Andhra Yuvati Mandali, a women's educational and social organization in 1936. Some time after 1950, she completed a course in journalism at Osmania University. Subsequently she published several short stories in journals such as Bharati and Sujata. She served as a member of both the central and state Film Award Committees. She was a nominated member of the State Legislative Council from 1958 to 1966.

Works
She has published over forty works, including twelve novels, several plays, and essays, biographies and short stories. She has used literature as a way of upholding ethical and cultural values. Her short story collection Swarnakamalalu depicts the multiplicity of human experience, insights into personal relationships, a progressive outlook and an engrossing style. She has also written children's literature, including a concise biography of Mahatma Gandhi, and Mahatmudu Mahila (Gandhiji's View about Woman), published in 1969 by Andhra Pradesh Sahitya Akademi.

Her other significant works are the novels: Muthyalu Manasu (1962; Muthtalu's heart), Darijerina Pranulu (1963; Lives That Have Reached the Shore), Tejomurtulu (1976; Icons of Light) and Akkaraku Vacchina Chuttamu (1967, A Helpful Relative); and the short story collection: Raja Hamsalu (1981, The Royal Swans). She has written over a hundred short stories which have since been published as a collection, Swarnakamalalu.

Recognition
In appreciation of her services to literature she was honoured in 1964 with the Grihalakshmi Sanstha Gold Bangle Award. The Andhra Pradesh Sahitya Akademi awarded her the Best Woman Writer Award in 1974. She received the Sahitya Akademi Award in 1982 for her short story collection, Swarnakamalalu.

References

Further reading

External links
 

1918 births
1998 deaths
Telugu women writers
Telugu writers
Recipients of the Sahitya Akademi Award in Telugu
20th-century Indian women writers
20th-century Indian novelists
20th-century Indian short story writers